This article concerns the period 369 BC – 360 BC

References